Roy Sabine (birth unknown) is an English former rugby union and professional rugby league footballer who played in the 1950s and 1960s, and coached rugby league in the 1970s. Roy Sabine served as a Private with the Duke of Wellington's Regiment.

Coaching career
Roy Sabine coached Keighley to the 1976 Challenge Cup semi-final during the 1975–76 season against St. Helens at Fartown Ground, Huddersfield on Saturday 3 April 1976.

Honoured at Keighley Cougars
Roy Sabine is a Keighley Cougars Hall of Fame inductee, he was inducted in 1999 alongside Len Ward.

References

External links

Search for "Roy" at rugbyleagueproject.org
Search for "Sabine" at rugbyleagueproject.org
Duke of Wellington's Regiment Rugby Union Team 1961–62
The Welshman who kicked an amazing 535 goals for Halifax (Includes photograph of Keighley team in 1962)
Tribute paid to legend Ward, 85

Living people
Duke of Wellington's Regiment soldiers
English rugby league coaches
English rugby league players
English rugby union players
Keighley Cougars coaches
Keighley Cougars players
Place of birth missing (living people)
Rugby league five-eighths
Rugby union centres
Year of birth missing (living people)
Yorkshire rugby league team players